Malaric or Amalaric was the last man to claim the kingship of the Suevi of Galicia. In 585, after the last king, Audeca, was defeated and captured by the Visigoths, Malaric, who claimed to be related to king Miro, rose in rebellion. According to John of Biclar, he was "defeated by King Leovigild's generals and was captured and presented in chains to Leovigild."

Sources

Arias, Jorge C. "Identity and Interactions: The Suevi and the Hispano-Romans." University of Virginia: Spring 2007.

6th-century Suebian kings